The Internazionali di Tennis Città di Todi is a professional tennis tournament played on outdoor clay courts. It is currently part of the Association of Tennis Professionals (ATP) Challenger Tour and has been held annually in Todi, Italy since 2007. In 2018 and 2019, the tournament was held in L'Aquila. Since 2010, the event has been held in combination with the Astra Italy Tennis Cup, a $10,000 tournament on the ITF Women's Circuit.

Past finals

Men's singles

Men's doubles

Women's singles

Women's doubles 

 
ATP Challenger Tour
ITF Women's World Tennis Tour
Tennis tournaments in Italy
Clay court tennis tournaments
Recurring sporting events established in 2007